Center for Religion, Ethics and Social Policy (CRESP) is a non-profit, nonsectarian, educational organization affiliated with Cornell University. It states that most but not all of its projects are locally based but seek national and international influence through direct work, outreach, and literature on religious tradition, spirituality and ethical thought.

CRESP Mission
CRESP states its mission is to "seek the active participation of concerned individuals at Cornell, in Ithaca, and beyond in fostering vital and caring communities to provide a foundation for a world of peace, mutual understanding, and respect for all life" and that its objective is to "increase the number of individuals and groups who are dedicated to building a just and sustainable society."

Background
CRESP was founded in 1971 as an outgrowth of Cornell United Religious Work (CURW). Its administrative offices are located in Cornell's Anabel Taylor Hall. Initially a think tank on issues of social justice, Many CRESP-sponsored projects to address the issues of the day are now independent agencies, including Eco-Justice, the Learning Web, anti-apartheid efforts, socially responsible advertising, draft counseling, and farming alternatives. CRESP now serves as the umbrella for sixteen projects and works with Cornell student groups on progressive issues, and has two affiliates, one located in a traditional village outside Dakar, Senegal, and the other in the rural mountains of the Dominican Republic.

United for Peace and Justice, an anti-war coalition of more than 1,300 international and United States-based organizations, counts CRESP as a member organization.

CRESP projects 
Current CRESP projects include: 
Alternatives Library 
Centro de Idiomas 
Committee on U.S.-Latin American Relations (CUSLAR) 
Ecovilliage
Engineers For A Sustainable World 
Ithaca City Of Asylum 
Positive News 
Simple Living America 
Take Back Your Time Day
TheocracyWatch
Tompkins County Living Wage Coalition 
Vitamin L

References

External links 
CRESP's website
CRESP - Cornell University

Cornell University
Organizations established in 1971
Non-profit organizations based in New York (state)
Religious organizations based in the United States
Ethics organizations
1971 establishments in New York (state)